The Deep & the Dark is the sixth studio album by Austrian symphonic metal band Visions of Atlantis, released on 16 February 2018. It is the first studio album to feature lead singers Clémentine Delauney and Siegfried Samer.

Reception 
The album received mostly positive reviews. Metalfan.nl gave it 80 out of 100 points, finding the album "a solid metal record showing the strongest sides of Visions Of Atlantis". Louderthanwords.eu called the album "a nice album to dream away with, with a longing to go on an adventure, looking for hidden treasures and sunken islands", giving the album an 8,5 out of 10. Travis Green from myglobalmind.com stated "I was excited about The Deep & The Dark when I saw who the two singers were, but I would never have expected it to turn out as well as it did! Visions of Atlantis have finally reached their full potential, delivering by far their best album to date!", giving it a 9,5 out of 10.

Track listing 
Lyrics by Clémentine Delauney and Siegfried Samer, except "Book of Nature", "The Last Home" and Prayer to the Lost by Clémentine Delauney.
All music by Frank Pitters, except "Prayer to the Lost" by Clémentine Delauney.
All arrangements by Frank Pitters.
All vocal lines by Frank Pitters, except "Book of Nature", "The Last Home" and "Prayer to the Lost" by Clémentine Delauney.

Personnel 

Band members
Clémentine Delauney – lead vocals, backing vocals
Siegfried Samer – lead vocals, backing vocals
Christian Douscha – guitars
Herbert Glos – bass guitars
Thomas Caser – drums

Guest musicians
Anton Konrath – shamanic voices, additional percussions
Frank Pitters – keyboards, backing vocals
Mike Koren – bass guitars on album

Production
Anton Konrath – engineer
Dominic Sebastian – engineer
Frank Pitters – producer, engineer, mixing
Mika Jussila – mastering

Charts

References 

2018 albums
Visions of Atlantis albums
Napalm Records albums